The Seychelles national badminton team represents Seychelles in international badminton team competitions. The Seychellois team is controlled by the Seychelles Badminton Association. While badminton is not popular in Seychelles, the island nation has competed in the African Badminton Championships and have decent results over the years.

The national team won the African Badminton Championships mixed team event in 2007 and were runners-up two years later. The team were semifinalists in the 2013 and 2014 African Badminton Championships. The team also participated in the Sudirman Cup two times in 2011 and 2015 but were eliminated in the group stage.

The Seychelles team also participated in the Commonwealth Games.

Participation in BWF competitions

Sudirman Cup

Participation in Commonwealth Games 
The Seychelles team debuted in the Commonwealth Games mixed team event in the 2010 edition. In the 2018 edition, team matches between Seychelles and Ghana in the group stage were halted when Seychelles had been disqualified from playing.

Mixed team

Participation in African Badminton Championships

Men's team

Women's team

Mixed team
{| class="wikitable"
|-
! Year !! Result
|-
| 2004 ||  Third place
|-
| 2006 ||  Semi-finalist
|-
| 2007 ||  Champions
|-
| 2009 ||  Runner-up
|-
| 2011 || Group stage
|-
| 2013 ||  Semi-finalist
|-
| 2014 ||  Semi-finalist
|}

 Participation in Indian Ocean Island Games 
The Seychellois badminton team participates the biennial Indian Ocean Island Games. The women's team were runners-up in the 2015 edition after losing to Mauritius. The men's team have been semifinalists in both editions.Men's teamWomen's team'''

Current squad 

Men
Georgie Cupidon
Kervin Ghislan
Steve Malcouzanne

Women
Juliette Ah-Wan
Chlorie Cadeau
Allisen Camille
Danielle Jupiter

References

Badminton
National badminton teams
Badminton in Seychelles